Dead Souls is a 1984 Soviet television miniseries directed by Mikhail Schweitzer, based on Nikolai Gogol's epic poem of the same name. This story has been shared in many different interpretations. In 1930, author Mikhail Bulgakov was commissioned to write the first adaptation of this novel for the Soviet stage at the Moscow Art Theater. The 1984 miniseries was based on the 1960 film adaptation directed by Leonid Trauberg, which was inspired the Moscow Art Theater script. This story was also adapted as an opera in the 1980s as an American-Soviet production that first opened in Boston. The first cinematic interpretation of this work was directed by Pyotr Chardynin in 1909.

Synopsis 
This is a small-screen rendering of Gogol's epic poem critiquing the class system in 19th-century Russia by the same name. In this film, main character Tchitchikov travels through the countryside buying dead souls, or serfs who had deceased. By purchasing the deed to these "property," Tchitchikov is able to improve his social standing at a discount as these individuals were still accounted for in property registers postmortem and the rights to ownership for deceased serfs was less than that of the living. Dead Souls is a critique and satire of middle class life in Imperial Russia.

Cast
 Aleksandr Trofimov – Nikolai Gogol
 Aleksandr Kalyagin – Chichikov
 Yuri Bogatyryov – Manilov
 Larisa Udovichenko – Manilov's wife
 Tamara Nosova – Korobochka
 Vitali Shapovalov – Nozdryov
 Aleksei Zaitsev – Selifan
 Viktor Sergachyov – Mizhuyev, Son-in-law
 Maria Vinogradova – Mavra
 Innokenty Smoktunovsky – Plushkin
 Vyacheslav Nevinny – Sobakevich
 Yuri Volyntsev – Alexei Ivanovich, Chief of Police
 Inna Churikova – Lady, nice in every respect
 Lidiya Fedoseyeva-Shukshina – Lady, just nice
 Irina Malysheva – Governor's daughter
 Yelizaveta Nikishchikhina – Sobakevich's wife
 Valeri Malyshev – Mikhei
 Aleksei Safonov – Public prosecutor

References

External links

 
 
 
 
 

1984 films
1984 comedy films
Films scored by Alfred Schnittke
Soviet comedy films
Russian comedy films
Mosfilm films
Soviet television miniseries
Films based on works by Nikolai Gogol
Films based on Russian novels
Films directed by Mikhail Shveytser
1980s Soviet television series
1980s television miniseries